Auxa bimaculipennis is a species of longhorn beetle in the subfamily Lamiinae. It was described by Breuning in 1957 and is endemic to Madagascar.

References

Auxa
Beetles described in 1957
Endemic fauna of Madagascar